The 1980–81 Hartford Whalers season was the Whalers' second season in the National Hockey League.

Offseason
On May 23, Hartford signed defenseman Thommy Abrahamsson as a free agent. Abrahamsson played in 26 games with Leksands IF of Elitserien, scoring nine goals and 15 points. Abrahamsson had previously played with the Whalers from 1974 to 1977, when the club was still a part of the WHA. In 203 games with New England, Abrahamsson scored 28 goals and 95 points.

Gordie Howe announced his retirement from the team on June 4. Howe retired as the highest scoring player in NHL history, as he scored 801 goals and added 1049 assists for 1850 points in 1767 games in a career that spanned from 1946 until 1980. Howe joined the Whalers organization in 1977, and in two seasons with the New England Whalers in the WHA, he scored 53 goals and 139 points in 134 games. In 1979–80, he remained with the club as they moved to the NHL, and Howe, at the age of 51, scored 15 goals and 41 points in 80 games, followed with a goal and two points in three playoff games. Following this announcement, the Whalers hired Howe as director of player development.

On June 5, the Whalers acquired center Rick Meagher, a third-round pick and a fifth-round pick in the 1981 NHL Entry Draft from the Montreal Canadiens in exchange for a third round and a fifth-round pick in 1981. Meagher appeared in only two games with Montreal during 1979–80, as he spent most of the season with their American Hockey League affiliate, the Nova Scotia Voyageurs. In 64 games with Nova Scotia, Meagher had 32 goals and 76 points, followed by three goals and seven points in six post-season games.

At the 1980 NHL Entry Draft held at the Montreal Forum on June 11, the Whalers selected defenseman Fred Arthur from the Cornwall Royals of the QMJHL with their first-round pick, eighth overall. In 67 games with Cornwall in 1979–80, Arthur scored five goals and 70 assists for 75 points. In the postseason, Arthur had two goals and 14 points in 18 games, helping Cornwall win the President's Cup and earn a berth at the 1980 Memorial Cup. During the Memorial Cup, Arthur had five assists in five games, helping the Royals win the championship.

On June 14, Hartford acquired goaltender Mike Veisor from the Chicago Black Hawks in exchange for a second-round draft pick in the 1981 NHL Entry Draft.  Veisor had a record of 3–5–3 with a 3.28 GAA and a .903 save percentage in 11 games with Chicago during 1979–80.

The Whalers acquired right winger Warren Miller off of waivers under terms from the 1979 expansion draft from the New York Rangers on August 7. The Whalers had to give the Rangers cash to complete the deal. Miller scored seven goals and 13 points in 55 games with New York in 1979–80. In 1978–79, Miller scored 26 goals and 49 points in 77 games with the New England Whalers.

On September 1, right winger Bobby Hull announced his retirement as a player. Hull appeared in nine games with Hartford in 1979–80, scoring two goals and seven points after he was acquired from the Winnipeg Jets. In 1090 career NHL games, Hull scored 616 goals and 1187 points as he played with the Chicago Black Hawks from 1957 to 1972 before signing with the Jets as a free agent. In 411 career WHA games with Winnipeg, Hull scored 303 goals and 638 points from 1972 to 1979, before rejoining the NHL in 1979–80 with the Jets.

On September 4, the Whalers traded away goaltender Al Smith to the Colorado Rockies in exchange for cash. Smith had a record of 11–10–8 with a 3.67 GAA and a .876 save percentage with the Whalers in 1979–80. In 1973, Smith led the Whalers to the Avco Cup, and in 1978, he won the Ben Hatskin Trophy which was awarded to the best goaltender in the World Hockey Association.

Regular season

October
The Whalers opened the 1980–81 season with a four-game road trip, and on October 9, they lost 8–6 to the St. Louis Blues, followed by a 9–3 loss two nights later against the Minnesota North Stars.  After a 2–2 tie against the Buffalo Sabres, the Whalers earned their first victory on October 15, with a 5–2 win over the Pittsburgh Penguins.

Hartford played their first home game of the season on October 18 against the Detroit Red Wings in front of 10,287 fans.  The Whalers Al Sims led the way with two goals, and John Garrett made 26 saves in the Whalers 4–2 victory.  The team would post a 3–0–1 record on their opening four game home stand.

The Whalers would finish the month with a solid record of 5–4–2, earning 12 points, and second place in the Norris Division, three points behind the first place Los Angeles Kings.

November
The Whalers would slump to begin the month of November, as the club would go winless in their first eight games (0-6-2) of the month before earning a 4–3 victory over the Vancouver Canucks on November 22.  The Whalers would follow that game up with a huge 11–3 loss to the Chicago Black Hawks the next night.

Hartford would end November with two wins in their final three games, bringing their season record to 8–12–4 record with 20 points, sitting in third place in the Norris Division.

December
The Whalers opened December with a five-game western road trip, in which the team put up a respectable 2–2–1 record, with wins over the Calgary Flames and Winnipeg Jets.

The team returned home for two games, as Hartford tied the Los Angeles Kings 5–5 on December 13, followed by a 5–4 win over the Boston Bruins on December 17.  The Whalers then headed out for a three-game road trip before Christmas, in which the Whalers tied the Bruins 5–5, lost to the Quebec Nordiques 6–5, followed by a huge 7–2 win over the Toronto Maple Leafs on December 23.

On December 26, the Whalers and Pittsburgh Penguins played a very high scoring game, as Hartford came out on top with a 9–7 victory.  Hartford ended the month with a 5–5 tie against the defending Stanley Cup champion New York Islanders the next night.

Overall, the Whalers had a 5–3–4 record in their 12 December games, and improved to 13–15–8, earning 34 points, for the season.  The Whalers continued to stay into third place in the Norris Division, five points ahead of the fourth place Pittsburgh Penguins.

January
Hartford got off to a bad start in January, losing their first three games, snapping their losing streak with a 6–6 tie against the Edmonton Oilers on January 9.  The Whalers earned their first win of the month the next night, defeating the Winnipeg Jets 5–3.

The Whalers losing ways would return though, as the club lost four games in a row, including three by one goal, before ending the streak with a tie against the St. Louis Blues on January 21.  Hartford would then lose their next two games, extending their winless streak to seven games, before the team finally defeated the Colorado Rockies 6–3 on January 28.  Hartford then went winless in their last two games (0-1-1) of the month.

The team managed a 2–10–3 record in 15 games for the month, and had a 15–25–11 record, getting 41 points at the end January.  Hartford fell into fourth place in the Norris Division, one point behind the third place Pittsburgh Penguins, and four points ahead of the last place Detroit Red Wings.

February
The Whalers losing ways continued into February, as Hartford would go winless in their first nine games of the month (0-4-5), and extend their overall winless streak to 11 games.

After their 6–2 loss to the Pittsburgh Penguins on February 19, the Whalers fired head coach Don Blackburn, and replaced him with Larry Pleau.

In his first game as the head coach, Pleau ended the Whalers winless skid, as Hartford defeated the New York Rangers 6–5 on February 22.  The club won their next game three nights later, defeating the Minnesota North Stars 3–2, however, their winning streak ended with a 5–1 loss to the Calgary Flames on February 27.

The Whalers had a 2–5–5 record in February, and had a 4–15–8 record since the start of January.  The Whalers overall season record at the end of February was 17-30-16, as they earned 50 points, and remained in fourth place in the Norris Division, only two points ahead of the Detroit Red Wings.

March/April
The Whalers began March with two straight losses before earning a 5–3 win over the Buffalo Sabres on March 6.  Hartford then went on a five-game winless skid (0-4-1) before earning another victory, which was a huge 9–3 win over the Montreal Canadiens.

Hartford would continue to struggle for the rest of the regular season, as they posted a 2–5–1 record in their final eight games after the 9–3 win over the Canadiens.

The team finished their second season with a 21–41–18 record, earning 60 points, and fourth place in the Norris Division, four points ahead of the Detroit Red Wings.  The Whalers failed to qualify for the playoffs for the first time in team history.

Final standings

Schedule and results

Playoffs
The Whalers failed to qualify for 1981 Stanley Cup playoffs, as the club finished with a 21–41–18 record, earning 60 points, which was 11 points behind the Toronto Maple Leafs for the final playoff position. This marked the first time since joining the NHL that the Whalers did not qualify for the playoffs.

Player statistics

Awards and records

Transactions
The Whalers were involved in the following transactions during the 1980–81 season.

Trades

Waivers

Free agents

Draft picks

Hartford's draft picks from the 1980 NHL Entry Draft which was held at the Montreal Forum in Montreal, Quebec, on June 11, 1980.

Farm teams

See also
1980–81 NHL season

References

External links

Hartford Whalers seasons
Hartford
Hartford
Hartford
Hartford